Milagros Fernández Ladra (born 27 February 1997) is an Argentine field hockey player and part of the Argentina national team.

She was also the part of the Argentine team that won the 2016 Women's Hockey Junior World Cup after a stunning victory over Netherlands in the finals.

References

External links

1997 births
Living people
Las Leonas players
Argentine female field hockey players
Female field hockey forwards
Field hockey players from Buenos Aires
South American Games medalists in field hockey
South American Games gold medalists for Argentina
HGC players